The Greater Profit is a 1921 American lost silent crime film directed by William Worthington and starring Edith Storey.

Cast
Edith Storey as Maury Brady
Pell Trenton as Captain Ward Ransom
Willis Marks as 'Nunc' Brady
Lloyd Bacon as Jim Crawkins
Bobbie Roberts as 'Gimp' the Hunchback
Ogden Crane as Creighton Hardage
Lillian Rambeau as Mrs. Creighton Hardage
Dorothy Wood as Rhoda Hardage

References

External links
The Greater Profit at IMDb

large poster

1921 films
Lost American films
American silent feature films
American black-and-white films
Films directed by William Worthington
1920s American films
1921 crime films
American crime films
Film Booking Offices of America films